Alphonse Matoubela (born 15 October 1958) is a boxer from the Republic of Congo, who competed in the lightweight (– 60 kg) division at the 1980 Summer Olympics. Matoubela lost his opening bout to Tibor Dezamits of Hungary by decision, 0-5. He was born in Léopoldville, Belgian Congo.

References

1958 births
Living people
Sportspeople from Kinshasa
Lightweight boxers
Olympic boxers of the Republic of the Congo
Boxers at the 1980 Summer Olympics
Republic of the Congo male boxers
21st-century Democratic Republic of the Congo people